The 1900 United States presidential election in Iowa took place on November 6, 1900. All contemporary 45 states were part of the 1900 United States presidential election. Voters chose 13 electors to the Electoral College, which selected the president and vice president.

Iowa was won by the Republican incumbent President William McKinley of Ohio and his running mate Theodore Roosevelt of New York.

Results

Results by county

See also
 United States presidential elections in Iowa

Notes

References

Iowa
1900
1900 Iowa elections